The 1975 Segunda División de Chile was the 24th season of the Segunda División de Chile.

Universidad Católica was the tournament's champion.

Table

See also
Chilean football league system

References

External links
 RSSSF 1975

Segunda División de Chile (1952–1995) seasons
Primera B
Chil